The 1933 All-Pro Team consisted of American football players chosen by various selectors for the All-Pro team of the National Football League (NFL) for the 1933 NFL season. Teams were selected by, among others, the NFL coaches (NFL), the United Press, Red Grange for Collyer's Eye (CE), and the Green Bay Press-Gazette (GB).

Team

References

All-Pro Teams
1933 National Football League season